The Roman Catholic Archdiocese of Hangzhou/Hangchow is an archdiocese located in the city of Hangzhou (Zhejiang) in China. The Archdiocese has not had a bishop with a papal mandate from 1956 until 2008. Matthew Cao Xiangde was appointed bishop by the Chinese Patriotic Catholic Association but then recognized by the Holy See.

History
 May 10, 1910: Established as Apostolic Vicariate of Western Chekiang from the Apostolic Vicariate of Chekiang
 December 3, 1924: Renamed as Apostolic Vicariate of Hangzhou
 April 11, 1946: Promoted as Metropolitan Archdiocese of Hangzhou

Leadership
 Archbishops of Hangzhou (Roman rite)
 Archbishop Jean-Joseph-Georges Deymier, C.M. (梅占魁) (April 11, 1946 – April 2, 1956)
 Vicars Apostolic of Hangzhou 杭州 (Roman Rite)
 Bishop Jean-Joseph-Georges Deymier, C.M. (梅占魁) (later Archbishop) (February 18, 1937 – April 11, 1946)
 Bishop Paul-Albert Faveau, C.M. (田法服) (May 10, 1910 – February 18, 1937)

Suffragan dioceses
 Lishui 麗水
 Ningbo 寧波
 Taizhou 台州
 Yongjia 永嘉

References

Sources

 GCatholic.org
 Catholic Hierarchy

Roman Catholic dioceses in China
Christian organizations established in 1910
Roman Catholic dioceses and prelatures established in the 20th century
1910 establishments in China
Christianity in Zhejiang